This is a list of transfers in Lithuanian football for the 2018–19 winter transfer window. Only confirmed moves featuring an A Lyga side are listed.

The winter transfer window opens on January 1, 2019, and will close on February 23, 2019. Deals may be signed at any given moment in the season, but the actual transfer may only take place during the transfer window. Unattached players may sign at any moment.

Transfers In

Transfers Out

Trials
Only following cases apply to this category:
 Player was on trial in A Lyga club, but haven't joined any club of the league;
 Player from the league was away in any other club for a trial, but wasn't sold, loaned out or released to another club in this transfer window.

Staff

References

Transfers
Transfers
Winter 2018-19
Football transfers winter 2018–19